Allanfearn is a small settlement, it lies  east of Inverness, Inverness-shire, Scotland, within the Scottish council area of Highland.

Agriculture and tourism
The village is located beside the Moray Firth with most of the fields now being used for hay making or grazing for cattle. The hamlet of Alturlie Point was once a fishing village with nine cottages which would have been the former homes of the salmon fishermen.

References

Populated places in Inverness committee area